BRD Tower may refer to:

BRD Tower Bucharest
BRD Tower Cluj-Napoca